Verhagen is a Dutch-language toponymic surname. It is a contraction of Van der Hagen, meaning "from/of the haag. A haag was a bushland, hedged lot, or (private) hunting ground. The name could also specifically refer to an origin in The Hague (since 1242 known as De Hage and variant spellings). Some variant spellings of the name are Verhaagen, Verhaegen, Verhaeghe, Verhaeghen, Verhage, and Verhaghen. People with the name include:

Ben Verhagen (born 1926), Dutch competitive sailor
, pseudonym of Alberta Rommel (1912–2001), German music educator and writer
Darrin Verhagen (born 1967), Australian electronic music composer
David A. Verhaagen (born 1964), American psychologist and writer
Drew VerHagen (born 1990), American baseball pitcher
Eduard Verhagen (born 1962), Dutch pediatrician and lawyer
Eric Verhagen (born 1964), Dutch sidecarcross passenger
Hans Verhagen (born 1939), Dutch journalist, poet, painter and filmmaker
Herna Verhagen (born 1966), Dutch businesswoman
Jean Verhagen (1923–1977), American actress  known as Jean Hagen
Maxime Verhagen (born 1956), Dutch politician and government minister
Neil Verhagen (born 2001), American racing driver
Pieter-Jozef Verhaghen (1728–1811), Flemish painter (also spelled "Verhagen")
Sanne Verhagen (born 1992), Dutch judoka
Steven Verhagen (usually "van der Hagen"; 1563–1621), Dutch sailor, first admiral of the Dutch East India Company
 (born 1981), Dutch racing cyclist

See also
Mount Verhage, Antarctic mountain named after US NAvy officer Ronald G. Verhage
Verhaegen, a surname
 Verhaeghe (disambiguation)

References

Dutch-language surnames
Surnames of Dutch origin
Toponymic surnames